Founded in 1993 by Stephen Arnold, Stephen Arnold Music is a Dallas-sonic branding agency and full-service music production company, with additional studios in Santa Fe, New Mexico. Often referred to as the most-heard, least-known composers in the world, Stephen Arnold Music has composed original music and sonic brands for hundreds of media outlets, content creators, networks, cable channels, television stations, corporations, production houses, and ad agencies.

Stephen Arnold Music clients include CNN,, The Weather Channel, and more than 380 television stations.

International clients include Al Watan Kuwait, and China Global Television Network,

Stephen Arnold Music was awarded an Emmy for its compositions for Comcast in 2003. The company has also won PromaxBDA Awards, which honor excellence in local media, marketing and design.

In 2008, Stephen Arnold Music launched The Vault, a production music library. Music from The Vault has been used by Altitude Sports, Golf Channel, ESPN, Discovery Channel and National Geographic Global Networks.

See also 
 Sound trademark
 Television news music

References

External links
StephenArnoldMusic.com - Stephen Arnold Music Official website
Stephen Arnold Music - News Music Search Archive
The Vault - The Vault Official website

Mass media companies established in 1993
1993 establishments in Texas
Companies based in Dallas
Mass media companies of the United States